Kettlethorpe may refer to:
Kettlethorpe, Lincolnshire, England
Kettlethorpe, West Yorkshire, England